Ray Richardson (born 9 September 1959) is an English former professional footballer. Born in London, he played in the Netherlands for Heracles, AZ, Cambuur, Heerenveen and RKC Waalwijk.

References

1959 births
Living people
English footballers
Heracles Almelo players
AZ Alkmaar players
SC Cambuur players
SC Heerenveen players
RKC Waalwijk players
Eerste Divisie players
Eredivisie players
English expatriate footballers
English expatriate sportspeople in the Netherlands
Expatriate footballers in the Netherlands
Association football defenders